Rock Comic Con is a touring nerd music festival created by Jon Price, Jeff LaGreca and Jeff LaGreca, all members of the band H2Awesome!, in 2010.  It was originally held to complement that year's New York Comic Con but has been held along with Denver Comic Con and billed as its "official after-party".  Proceeds from Rock Comic Con 1 went to the Comic Book Legal Defense Fund.

Event history

References

External links

 Official website

Rock festivals in the United States
Nerd music